"The Puffy Shirt" is the second episode of the fifth season of the American NBC sitcom Seinfeld. It was the 66th episode and originally aired on September 23, 1993. The episode centers on Jerry having to wear an ostentatious "puffy" shirt on The Today Show after he unwittingly agreed to promote it for Kramer's girlfriend because she spoke too quietly for him to understand what she was asking. In a subplot, George embarks on a promising career as a hand model. Larry David, the co-creator of the show, came up with the idea to use the shirt, and cites this episode as one of his favorites in the series.

Plot
Kramer is dating Leslie, a "low-talker" whom everyone struggles to understand due to her quiet speaking voice. When Jerry and Elaine have dinner with them, Kramer explains that Leslie is a fashion designer and has designed a new puffy shirt "like the pirates used to wear." Elaine tells Leslie that Jerry is making an appearance on The Today Show to promote a Goodwill benefit to clothe the poor and homeless. Leslie says something in response, but they cannot make out what it is. To be polite, they nod their heads. The next day, Kramer delivers the shirt to Jerry, who realizes that he had inadvertently agreed to wear Leslie's puffy shirt on The Today Show. The idea of wearing such an ostentatious shirt while promoting a benefit for the poor outrages Elaine.

At a restaurant with his parents, George accidentally bumps into a woman who turns out to be a modeling agent. When she notices his hands, she declares they are beautiful and that he should become a hand model. He agrees, and in preparation for his first photo shoot becomes protective of his hands, having manicures and shielding them with oven mitts.

During the Today Show, host Bryant Gumbel repeatedly mocks Jerry's shirt, driving him to angrily denounce it on air. Leslie finally raises her voice to furiously call Jerry a "bastard". After the show, George arrives at the dressing room and takes off his oven mitts to show off his hands. When he mocks the puffy shirt, Leslie angrily pushes him, causing him to fall onto a hot clothes iron and ruin his hands, ending his hand model career.

Elaine is fired from the Goodwill benefit committee, Jerry is heckled about the shirt during his stand-up comedy, and Kramer breaks up with Leslie. The stores cancel their pre-orders and the unsold shirts are given to Goodwill. As Jerry, Kramer, Elaine, and George walk down the street, they see homeless men dressed in the puffy shirts. Jerry remarks that it is not a bad-looking shirt after all.

Production
This was the first episode to feature Jerry Stiller as George Costanza’s dad, Frank. Stiller reshot John Randolph's earlier appearance as Frank in "The Handicap Spot" for syndication.

References

External links
 

Seinfeld (season 5) episodes
1993 American television episodes
Television episodes written by Larry David